R&S may refer to:

R&S Records, Belgian record label
Rabén & Sjögren, Swedish book publisher
Rohde & Schwarz, German electronics company

See also 
RS (disambiguation)
RNS (disambiguation)